The Crow is a supernatural superhero comic book series created by James O'Barr revolving around the titular character of the same name. The series, which was originally created by O'Barr as a means of dealing with the death of his fiancée at the hands of a drunk driver, was first published by Caliber Comics in 1989. It became an underground success, and was later adapted into a film of the same name in 1994. Three film sequels, a television series, and numerous books and comic books (published by numerous companies) have also been subsequently produced.

The Crow has been translated into almost a dozen languages and has sold around 750,000 copies worldwide.

Publication history

Caliber Press 

The Crow first appeared on the back cover of Deadworld #10 (November 1988); James O'Barr provided a back cover to the first comic book Caliber Press published, which contained an advertisement for the upcoming The Crow appearance in Caliber Presents #1. (The ads shows The Crow standing with a smoking shotgun in one hand and a samurai sword in the other, with the statement, "For Some Things...There Is No Forgiveness". It mentions The Crow appearing in February 1989.)

The Crow's first in-story appearance was in Caliber Presents #1 (January 1989), in the story "Inertia", which serves as a prequel to the main series. O'Barr again provided a back cover for this issue.

The character's first limited series was The Crow #1–4 (February–May 1989). Four issues, titled "Pain", "Fear", "Irony", and "Despair," take readers through a series of vengeance tales as The Crow cuts and shoots through Tin-Tin, Tom-Tom, Top Dollar, Funboy and T-Bird, the gang members that attacked and killed him and his lover Shelly.

In A Caliber Christmas (December 1989), Eric reflects back on happier times with Shelly in the story "Atmosphere." (In The Crow graphic novel, this story is placed between issues #2 and 3.)

Caliber Presents #15 (September 1990) contained a key preview of The Crow #5, titled "Death" which was left unpublished. The preview was a story to conclude the original arc.

Tundra Publishing 
Tundra Publishing later reprinted Caliber's first four issues in two double-sized volumes and printed "Death" (also double-sized) as the third volume.

Kitchen Sink Press 
In 1993, Kitchen Sink Press collected The Crow into a graphic novel. A limited hardcover edition was also released by Graphitti Designs.

From 1996–1998, Kitchen Sink published five mini-series and a one-shot based on The Crow concept with a new avatar in each series.

London Night Studios 
Following the Kitchen Sink series, London Night Studios published The Crow/Razor: Kill the Pain in 1998, which saw Eric Draven paired with Everette Hartsoe's bad girl character Razor in five numbered issues (#0–4), plus "Finale" and "The Lost Chapter" in February 1999.

Image Comics 
In 1999, Image Comics released a new Crow comic series with yet another take on the Eric Draven story. It ran for ten issues, ending in November of that year.

Pocket Books 
In 2002, Pocket Books re-released the original Crow graphic novel after being out-of-print for several years

Gallery Books 
O'Barr stated in a 2004 interview that an Author's Edition would contain at least "60 pages of new material that no one has ever seen. Half of that are pages that had to be removed for space reasons." O'Barr described the additions as including "more romance flashback scenes between Eric and Shelly," as well as sequences that would make the work "more visually interesting." On January 16, 2010, it was announced on O'Barr's official website that the Author's Edition of The Crow was indeed going to be released and that O'Barr was currently working on it. On April 7, 2011, O'Barr announced that The Crow: Special Edition would be released on July 28, 2011, from Gallery Books.

IDW Publishing 
In July 2012, IDW Publishing published a new five-issue Crow series, The Crow: Death and Rebirth, written by novelist John Shirley (co-writer of the original Crow film) and illustrated by Kevin Colden.

Four more IDW Crow series followed: The Crow: Skinning the Wolves (2013), The Crow: Curare (2013), The Crow: Pestilence (2014) and The Crow: Memento Mori (2018).

Plot
The story revolves around an unfortunate young man named Eric. He and his fiancée, Shelly, are assaulted by a gang of street thugs after their car breaks down. Eric is shot in the head and is paralyzed, and can only watch as Shelly is savagely beaten, raped, and then shot in the head. They are then left for dead on the side of the road. Eric later dies in the hospital operating room while Shelly is DOA.

He is resurrected by a crow and seeks vengeance on the murderers, methodically stalking and killing them. When not on the hunt, Eric stays in the house he shared with Shelly, spending most of his time there, lost in memories of her. Her absence is torture for him; he is in emotional pain, even engaging in self-mutilation by cutting himself.

The crow acts as both a guide and goad for Eric, giving him information that helps him in his quest but also chastising him for dwelling on Shelly's death, seeing his pining as useless self-indulgence that distracts him from his purpose.

Characters

 Eric: The main character. He was shot in the head and paralyzed, having seen all the brutal things done to Shelly, dying shortly after. A year after his death, his soul is brought back into his dead body. Unlike the movie, however, since Eric is basically a walking corpse, he does not heal and is totally invulnerable. The fact that there are no conditions or limitations to Eric's presence or powers gives the character a unique presence that does not exist in any other hero. He is completely unstoppable compared to any other mortal character in his universe.
 The crow (bird): serves as a guide to Eric as well as a companion. Unlike in the movie, the crow is not a real bird but a spirit that only Eric sees (and T-Bird, once, at the very end). Given its nature, it cannot be killed.
 The Skull Cowboy: a dark character that exists mostly to keep Eric on track in his mission and keep him from becoming too attached to his memories.
 Shelly: Fiancée of Eric who gets raped and killed by T-Bird's gang. She appears in Eric's dreams and memories.
 Sherri: A young street girl whom Eric meets while going after Funboy. Sherri is shown as upset, due to her mother not being there for her, and even goes so far as to tell Eric that she believes she's been bad and God sent her to Hell. She and Eric seem to bond closely, and feeling sorry for her, Eric gives her Shelly's engagement ring. She's overjoyed, because no one has ever given her a gift before, and she calls him a "clown" while he calls her a "princess". She is renamed Sarah in the film adaptation.
 T-Bird: The head of the gang that murders Shelly and Eric.
 Funboy: T-Bird's right-hand man, a morphine addict who is sleeping with Sherri's mother.
 Top Dollar: A low-level drug dealer who also participated in gang-raping Shelly; in the film adaptation, he is the main antagonist rather than T-Bird.
 Tin-Tin: The first of T-Bird's gang to be eliminated by Eric.
 Tom-Tom: Another of T-Bird's soldiers and one of Shelly's rapists, whom Eric interrogates over the whereabouts of Shelly's ring. Tom-Tom is absent from the film adaptation and his role is largely rewritten into a new character, Skank.
 Gideon: A pawnbroker who fences Shelly's engagement ring after it is given to him by T-Bird; in the film adaptation, Tin-Tin gives him the ring.
 Officer Albrecht: A beat cop who confronts Eric outside of Gideon's pawnshop.
 Captain Hook: The detective who originally handled Eric and Shelly's case. Eric sends him his regards through Albrecht.

Critical reception
The Crow is ranked 37th in IGN's Top 100 Comic Book Heroes. In 2005, creator James O'Barr claimed that The Crow was:
The best-selling independent black-and-white graphic novel of all time.
Translated into almost a dozen languages.
Sold over a quarter-million copies worldwide.
The second American comic book to get its author the "Storyteller Award" by the Angoulême International Comics Festival held annually in Angoulême, France.

In other media

Film
In 1994, a film based on the comic (titled The Crow) was released to theaters by Miramax Films. The film was both a critical and commercial success, earning $50,693,129 total gross during its 1994 United States theatrical release. A cult following, in part due to the accidental death of its star Brandon Lee on the film's set, has maintained the film's popularity, with a regular staple of movie memorabilia being found at retailers like Hot Topic. Three sequels have been made so far: The Crow: City of Angels (1996), starring Vincent Pérez (as The Crow), Mia Kirshner, Richard Brooks and Iggy Pop; The Crow: Salvation (2000), starring Eric Mabius (as The Crow), Kirsten Dunst and Fred Ward; and The Crow: Wicked Prayer (2005), starring Edward Furlong (as The Crow), David Boreanaz and Tara Reid.

In the late 1990s, a sequel/reboot to The Crow entitled The Crow: 2037 was in the works; it would be set in the future. It was written and scheduled to be directed by Rob Zombie, but it was ultimately cancelled.

On April 1, 2022, a new attempt at a remake was announced by The Hollywood Reporter, with Bill Skarsgård set to star as Draven, Rupert Sanders directing, and Edward R. Pressman and Malcolm Gray co-producing. Days later, the site also reported that FKA Twigs had been cast as Draven's fiancée. In July 2022, production on the reboot was reportedly underway in Prague, Czech Republic. By August 26, 2022, Danny Huston was cast in an undisclosed role. On September 16, 2022, the film wrapped production.

Television
A television series, The Crow: Stairway to Heaven (1998), was based on the first movie with Mark Dacascos replacing Lee in the role of Eric Draven.

Novels and story collections 
From 1996–2001, a number of novels based on the world and thematic concerns of The Crow were published, mostly by Harper. Authors of these novels included such notable names as Chet Williamson, David Bischoff, Poppy Z. Brite, S. P. Somtow, Norman Partridge, and A. A. Attanasio.

In 1998, O'Barr and editor Ed Kramer asked an array of fiction writers, poets, and artists—including Gene Wolfe, Alan Dean Foster, Charles de Lint, Jack Dann, Jane Yolen, Henry Rollins and Iggy Pop—to interpret this Gothic fiction phenomenon. The Crow: Shattered Lives and Broken Dreams was released by Random House on Halloween; and a year later, in a limited signed and numbered volume, by Donald M. Grant Publishing.

Video games 
The Crow: City of Angels is a 1997 action video game for Sega Saturn, Sony PlayStation and Microsoft Windows. It is loosely based on the movie of the same title. The player assumes the role of the hero of the film, Ashe Corven. It received negative reviews. Ojom GmbH released a j2me game called simply The Crow.

Music 
There have been five albums of music related to The Crow and its attendant films:
 Fear and Bullets (1994) – an album created through a collaboration between James O'Barr and longtime friend John Bergin as a soundtrack to O'Barr's graphic novel The Crow. It was originally released in 1994 along with a limited edition hardcover copy of the graphic novel.
 The Crow: Original Motion Picture Soundtrack (1994) – showcases the film's music by popular artists
 The Crow: Original Motion Picture Score (1994) – original music written by Graeme Revell for the film The Crow; not to be confused with the soundtrack album, above
 The Crow: City of Angels (1996) – soundtrack to the film of the same name; features a cover of the Fleetwood Mac song "Gold Dust Woman" by Hole, as well as tracks by artists such as White Zombie, Korn, and Iggy Pop. Like the original Crow soundtrack, a song by Joy Division (one of O'Barr's favorite bands) is covered: "In a Lonely Place," by Bush.
  The Crow: Salvation (2000) – again compiled and produced by Jeff Most. As with the soundtrack to The Crow: City of Angels, it includes an otherwise unavailable cover version by Hole: this time of Bob Dylan's "It's All Over Now, Baby Blue". Several other notable contemporary artists are also featured on the soundtrack.
 Metalcore band Ice Nine Kills released the song "A Grave Mistake" as part of their 2018 "Silver Scream" album. The song is directly inspired by the 1994 film. A slower, live version of the song was also released with the "Final" version of the album.

Card games 
The Crow is an out-of-print collectible card game by Heartbreaker Press and Target Games. It is based on The Crow comics by James O'Barr and depicted images from the movie. It was released in November 1995 but initially had a release date of March 1995. It was one of three sets released by Heartbreaker Press and Target Games in November along with James Bond 007 and Kult. The game did not have starter decks, and instead it had a core set with 122 cards that included 10 foils that had artwork from the comic. The game was sold in booster packs of 15 cards, but no starter packs were available. A promo card called The Confident Crow was available by mail through proof-of-purchase order. An expansion titled Crow: City of Angels was announced for an October 1996 release but never materialized.

Players control Angel, Devil, and Neutral Bystander cards and then send them into combat with "opposing [P]ersonalities". Action cards allow players to pump or hinder a Personality. Each Personality has an attack and defense value, as well as Virtue, which is equal to the highest value. Players play their Personality card and discard cards from their hands equal to the Virtue of the played card, and then they attack. If a player has a higher attack value than their opponent's defense value, the opponent is wounded. If a Personality would be wounded again, it is killed. A player wins by killing 25 Virtue worth of an opponent's Personalities.

Andy Butcher reviewed The Crow for Arcane magazine, rating it a 6 out of 10 overall. Butcher comments that "The Crow is a simple game that would serve as a good introduction to CCGs. There's just enough depth to give it some skill, and the game mechanics are elegant. Experienced players may find it limiting and lacking in lasting appeal."

Bibliography

Comics
The Crow (4 issues, 1989, Caliber Press) by James O'Barr
 Collected with the addition of new material as The Crow: Special Edition (Gallery Books, 2011)
The Crow: Dead Time (3 issues, 1996, Kitchen Sink Press) story by James O'Barr & John Wagner, art by Alexander Maleev
 Collected as The Crow: Midnight Legends Volume 1: Dead Time (IDW), 2012)
The Crow: Flesh and Blood (3 issues, 1996, Kitchen Sink) story by James Vance, art by Alexander Maleev
 Collected as The Crow: Midnight Legends Volume 2: Flesh and Blood (IDW, 2012)
The Crow: City of Angels (3 issues, 1996, Kitchen Sink) adapted from the screenplay)
The Crow: Wild Justice (3 issues, 1996, Kitchen Sink) story by Jerry Prosser, art by Charlie Adlard
 Collected as The Crow: Midnight Legends Volume 3: Wild Justice (IDW, 2013)
The Crow: Waking Nightmares (4 issues, 1997–1998, Kitchen Sink) story by Christopher Golden, art by Philip Hester
 Collected as The Crow: Midnight Legends Volume 4: Waking Nightmares (IDW, 2013)
The Crow #0: A Cycle of Shattered Lives (one-shot, 1998, Kitchen Sink) story by James O'Barr / various
The Crow / Razor: Kill the Pain (7 issues, 1998–1999, London Night Studios) story by Everette Hartsoe
Todd McFarlane Presents: The Crow (10 issues, 1999, Image Comics), story by Jon J Muth, art by Jamie Tolagson & Paul Lee
Issue #1–5 collected as The Crow: Midnight Legends Volume 5: Resurrection (IDW, 2013)
Issue #6–10 collected as The Crow: Midnight Legends Volume 6: Touch Of Evil (IDW, 2014)
The French Crow (5 volumes, 2002–2011, Goutte D'Or Production / Réflexions) stories by various, including Isha ("La Mort Sur Le Trottoir"), Christophe Henin ("Medieval Crow") and Yoann Boisseau ("Le Sang des Innocents"), published in France
The Crow: Death & Rebirth (5 issues, 2012, IDW) story by John Shirley, art by Kevin Colden
The Crow: Skinning the Wolves (3 issues, 2012, IDW) story by James O'Barr and Jim Terry
The Crow: Curare (3 issues, 2013, IDW) story by James O'Barr, art by Antoine Dodé
The X-Files/The Crow: Conspiracy (one-shot, 2014, IDW) story by Denton J. Tipton, art by Vic Malhotra
The Crow: Pestilence (4 issues, 2014, IDW) story by Frank Bill, art by Drew Moss
The Crow: Memento Mori (4 issues, 2018, IDW) story by Roberto Recchioni and Matteo Scalera, art by Werther Dell'Edera and Matteo Scalera
The Crow: Hack/Slash (4 issues, 2019, IDW) story by Tim Seeley, art by Jim Terry
 The Crow: Hark the Herald (one-shot, 2019, IDW) story by Tim Seeley, art by Meredith Laxton
 The Crow: Lethe (3 issues, 2020, IDW) story by Tim Seeley, art by Ilias Kyriazis

Novels
The Crow: Die Krähe (Goldmann Wilhelm GmbH, 1994) by Kenneth Roycroft, in German
The Crow: City of Angels (Berkeley, 1996) by Chet Williamson
The Crow: Quoth the Crow (Harper, 1998) by David Bischoff
The Crow: The Lazarus Heart (Harper Prism, 1998) by Poppy Z. Brite
The Crow: Clash by Night (Harper, 1998) by Chet Williamson
The Crow: Temple of Night (Harper, 1999) by S. P. Somtow
The Crow: Wicked Prayer (Harper, 2000) by Norman Partridge
The Crow: Hellbound (Harper, 2001) by A. A. Attanasio

Short stories
The Crow: Shattered Lives & Broken Dreams (Random House, 1999) ed. James O'Barr & Ed Kramer
Sarah: The Tears of the Crow (2020) by Lionel Boulet

See also
 The Raven
 Devil's Night
 Anthony (comics)
 List of comic books
 List of fictional birds

References

 
1989 comics debuts
American comics adapted into films
Comics adapted into television series
Fantasy comics
Image Comics titles
Fictional undead
Detroit in fiction
Comics about revenge
Self-harm in fiction
Fiction about resurrection
Dark fantasy
Action comics
Drama comics
Crime comics
Gothic comics
Thriller comics
Caliber Comics titles
Kitchen Sink Press titles
IDW Publishing titles